An agricultural society may refer to:

An agrarian society, one where the chief occupation is agriculture: typically contrasted with an industrial society

An agricultural society may also refer to an organization devoted to the improvement of agriculture, such as:

The Royal Agricultural Society of the Commonwealth
The Royal Agricultural Society
The Royal Agricultural Society of New South Wales
The Royal Agricultural Society of Tasmania
The Yonge Street Agricultural Society
The Odiham Agricultural Society
The Yorkshire Agricultural Society
The New York State Agricultural Society
 Krishibid Institution Bangladesh

nl:Landbouwsamenleving